This is a list of number-one singles in Sweden at "Kvällstoppen" (Evening top list) 1962–1975, "Topplistan" (The top list) 1975–1997, "Hitlistan" (The hit list) 1998–2007, "Sverigetopplistan" (The Swedish top list) 2007 and forward.

Swedish number-one singles and albums

1962–1975 
(note that Kvällstoppen was a combined singles and album chart, with singles dominating a large portion of the 1960s. The first album to reach number one was Abbey Road by the Beatles in 1969, and the first Swedish-language album was Cornelis sjunger Taube by Cornelis Vreeswijk that same year)

Swedish number-one singles

1975–2006

Swedish number-one singles and albums

2007

2008

2009

2010

2011

2012

2013

2014

2015

2016

2017

2018

2019

2020

2021

2022

2023

See also 

 List of number-one singles on Tio i Topp, a contemporary official Swedish chart compiling a list between 1961 and 1974.

Notes

References
 Sverigetopplistan
 Swedish Singles Charts, archives